Erskine King (born 1 September 1948) is a Barbadian cricketer. He played in two first-class matches for the Barbados cricket team in 1966/67 and 1968/69.

See also
 List of Barbadian representative cricketers

References

External links
 

1948 births
Living people
Barbadian cricketers
Barbados cricketers
People from Christ Church, Barbados